The Greater Philadelphia Coalition Against Hunger (GPCAH) is a support organization for residents in the Greater Philadelphia region founded in 1996. Its mission is connecting people with food assistance programs including, SNAP benefits, food banks, soup kitchens and "to build a community where all people have the food they need to lead healthy lives".

History
The Greater Philadelphia Coalition Against Hunger was founded in 1996 as an organization which can help network people to food, shelter and connections with Supplemental Nutrition Assistance Program (SNAP) benefits. In 2019 Alyssa Bradley, advocacy and communications associate stated "we are working to help out in a couple of different ways. We are helping folks sign up for SNAP benefits if they do qualify". Kathy Fisher, policy director wants to eradicated the stigma that views food stamps users as "freeloaders".

During the 2018 "Eaglesgiving" event, Laura Wall, executive director of the GPCAH, worked with the Philadelphia Eagles to assist in selecting the Feast of Justice. She was impressed with the effort the Eagles put into the event.

In 2019, the United States federal government shutdown delayed SNAP benefits from being received prompting phone calls from SNAP recipients to GPCAH. The organization worked "to connect government workers affected by the shutdown with Supplemental Nutrition Assistance Program (SNAP) benefits".

Stroehmann Walk + Run Against Hunger
The Coalition organizes the annual Stroehmann Walk+Run Against Hunger, which is a 5K race held in April that raises funds for more than 100 food pantries, soup kitchens and hunger-relief agencies in Southeastern Pennsylvania and South Jersey.

The Walk+Run Against also benefits the region's leading hunger-relief agencies, including the Coalition Against Hunger, The Food Trust, SHARE Food Program and Philabundance.

References

External links
 

Organizations based in Philadelphia
1996 establishments in Pennsylvania
Charities based in Pennsylvania
Hunger relief organizations
Non-profit organizations based in Philadelphia